Amsactarctia pulchra is a moth of the family Erebidae. It was described by Walter Rothschild in 1933. It is found in Ethiopia and Kenya.

References

Moths described in 1933
Spilosomina
Moths of Africa
Insects of Ethiopia